Zofia Krzeptowska (born 8 June 1934) is a Polish cross-country skier. She competed in the women's 10 kilometres and the women's 3 × 5 km relay events at the 1956 Winter Olympics.

Cross-country skiing results

Olympic Games

World Championships

References

External links
 

1934 births
Living people
Polish female cross-country skiers
Olympic cross-country skiers of Poland
Cross-country skiers at the 1956 Winter Olympics
Sportspeople from Zakopane